The Florence Falls (Aboriginal: Karrimurra) is a segmented waterfall on the Florence Creek located within the Litchfield National Park in the Northern Territory of Australia.

Location and features

A sign post at Florence Falls mentions two walks for hiking. The 'Shady Creek Walk' is graded easy with a distance of  return. The 'Florence Creek Walk' is also graded easy with a distance of  return. The Florence Falls plunge pool is listed as "great for a refreshing swim" besides the usual safety warnings.

See also

 List of waterfalls of the Northern Territory

References

External links

Waterfalls of the Northern Territory
Segmented waterfalls
Litchfield National Park